Ulagam Palavitham is a 1955 Indian Tamil-language film, directed by S. A. Murugesh. The film stars Sivaji Ganesan and Lalitha. The musical score of this film was composed by N. S. Balakrishnan. The film was dubbed in Telugu as Antha Peddale in 1959.

Plot

Cast 

Male cast
Sivaji Ganesan as Arunagiri
P. S. Veerappa
V. K. Ramasamy
T. K. Ramachandran
K. A. Thangavelu
T. V. Radhakrishnan
M. R. Santhanam
S. V. Shanmugam
M. A. Ganapathy

Female cast
Lalitha as Indra
M. Lakshmiprabha
M. N. Rajam
M. Saroja
C. K. Saraswathi
Baby T. R. Rajakumari

Production 
Ulagam Palavitham was directed by S. A. Murugesh, and produced by National Productions. The screenplay was written by T. R. Raghunath, and the dialogues by V. N. Sambandham. Cinematography was handled by G. Vittal Rao, and editing by Murugesh.

Soundtrack 
The music was composed by N. S. Balakrishnan, with lyrics by Thanjai N. Ramaiah Dass. Lyrics were written by Thanjai N. Ramaiah Dass, K. P. Kamatchi Sundaram and A. Maruthakasi.

Release 
Ulagam Palavitham was released on 14 April 1955, delayed from an initial March release.

References

External links 
 

1955 films
1950s Tamil-language films